Sport- und Schwimmverein Jahn Regensburg e. V., commonly known as SSV Jahn Regensburg, Jahn Regensburg, SSV Jahn or simply Jahn is a German football club based in Regensburg, Bavaria. The club is based on a gymnastics club founded in 1886 as Turnerbund Jahn Regensburg which took its name from Friedrich Ludwig Jahn, whose ideas of gymnastics greatly influenced German sport in the 19th century. The football department was created in 1907.

The footballers left their parent club in 1924 to form Sportbund Jahn Regensburg, in 1934 they were combined with two further sports clubs, Sportverein 1889 Regensburg and Schwimmverein 1920 Regensburg, to Sport- und Schwimmverein Jahn 1889 Regensburg, today commonly known as SSV Jahn 1889 Regensburg with the departments athletics, boxing, futsal, gymnastics, handball, kendo and nine-pin bowling. The football department separated in 2000 and is called SSV Jahn Regensburg.

SSV Jahn play their home games at Jahnstadion Regensburg since 2015. The club colours are white and red, the team's most common nicknames 'Rothosen' (Red Shorts) and 'Jahnelf' (Jahn Eleven). Jahn currently plays in the 2. Bundesliga, the German second division, having been promoted from the 3. Liga in season 2016–17.

History
The merger in 1934 to form SSV Jahn Regensburg strengthened the football side somewhat, but mostly produced only indifferent results, from 1927 in the Bezirksliga Bayern, coming second as its best result in 1930. In the Gauliga Bayern, one of sixteen top flight divisions formed in the re-organization of German football under the Third Reich in 1933, Jahn lasted for only two seasons before being relegated in 1935. It returned in 1937 and their best performances were consecutive third-place finishes in 1938 and 1939 after which they languished as an uncompetitive mid-to-lower table side.

The club spent most of the period between the end of World War II and the formation of the Bundesliga in 1963 as a "yo-yo team" bouncing up and down between the Oberliga Süd and the second division. Regensburg played the early 1960s in the third division before making their way back to the Regionalliga Süd (II). By the mid 1970s the team began to falter and by the end of the decade had become a third and fourth division side, even playing three years in the Landesliga Bayern-Mitte (V) in the late 1990s.

In 2000 the football team left to become an independent club and were joined by players from SG Post/Süd Regensburg in 2002. Regensburg has recovered to some degree and has played in the Regionalliga Süd (III) since the turn of the millennium with a single season in the 2. Bundesliga in 2003–04. However, the club faced financial difficulties and narrowly avoided bankruptcy in 2005. After sinking to the fourth division Oberliga Bayern in 2005–06, Jahn achieved first place in the following season and were promoted again to the Regionalliga Süd. Due to a reorganisation of the leagues, Jahn had to finish in tenth place or higher in order to stay in the third division, which is now the new 3. Liga. Jahn struggled to do so but finished ninth in the end and gained entry to the new league.

The club played its first two seasons in the 3. Liga close to the relegation zone but then improved to the point that it came third in 2011–12 and qualified to play against the Karlsruher SC in the promotion round to the 2. Bundesliga. Draws in 1–1 at Regensburg and in 2–2 at Karlsruhe meant Jahn's return to second level after eight years according to away goal rule.

The Jahn finished last in the 2. Bundesliga in 2012–13 and was relegated back to the 3. Liga, finishing eleventh in 2013–14. In 2014–15 they also finished last in the 3. Liga and were relegated back to the Regionalliga. In the following season, they made the first place in the Regionalliga Bayern and faced the Regionalliga Nord champions VfL Wolfsburg II in the play-offs. The club defeated Wolfsburg II 2–1 on aggregate and immediately returned to third level for the 2015–16 season. Another great season followed in the 3. Liga, with Regensburg finishing third. Like in 2012, they were promoted via the play-off, defeating 1860 Munich 3–1 on aggregate.

Players

Current squad

Out on loan

Reserve team

SSV Jahn Regensburg II (or SSV Jahn Regensburg Amateure) made a single season appearance in the southern division of the Amateurliga Bayern in 1962–63, the last year of the league being divided into two regional divisions. An eleventh place in the league that season was not enough to qualify for the new single-division league and the team also did not become part of the new Landesliga Bayern-Mitte.

A lengthy period in the lower amateur divisions followed until 2002, when the merger of the first team with SG Post/Süd Regensburg allowed the reserve side to take Post's place in the Bayernliga, where the team played from 2002 to 2006. In 2006, the first team's relegation meant, they had to move down one level even so they finished eleventh this season. After three average seasons, the side became a promotion contender again, finishing second in 2010–11 but losing to SpVgg Bayern Hof in the promotion round.

At the end of the 2011–12 season, the club qualified directly for the newly expanded Bayernliga after finishing third in the Landesliga.

Recent managers
Recent managers of the club:

Recent seasons
The recent season-by-season performance of the club:

SSV Jahn Regensburg

SSV Jahn Regensburg II

With the introduction of the Bezirksoberligas in 1988 as the new fifth tier, below the Landesligas, all leagues below dropped one tier. With the introduction of the Regionalligas in 1994 and the 3. Liga in 2008 as the new third tier, below the 2. Bundesliga, all leagues below dropped one tier. With the establishment of the Regionalliga Bayern as the new fourth tier in Bavaria in 2012 the Bayernliga was split into a northern and a southern division, the number of Landesligas expanded from three to five and the Bezirksoberligas abolished. All leagues from the Bezirksligas onwards were elevated one tier.

Key

Honours

League
 2. Oberliga Süd (II)
 Champions: 1953
 Bayernliga (II-III-IV)
 Champions: 1949, 1967, 1975, 2000, 2007
 Runners-up: 1946, 1964
 Bayernliga South (II)
 Runners-up: 1947, 1948
 Landesliga Bayern-Mitte (IV)
 Champions: 1966, 1983, 1990
 Runners-up: 1997, 2011‡
 2. Amateurliga Niederbayern (IV)
 Champions: 1962‡

Cup
 Bavarian Cup
 Winners: 1947, 1948, 2001, 2004‡, 2005, 2010, 2011
 Runners-up: 2002
 Oberpfalz Cup
 Winners: 2001, 2002, 2003, 2004‡, 2006

Youth
 Under 19 Bayernliga
 Winners: 2005, 2007
 Runners-up: 2013
 Under 17 Bayernliga
 Winners: 2007
 Runners-up: 2003
 Under 15 Bayernliga
 Winners: 2015
 Runners-up: 2005, 2012
 ‡ Reserve team

References

External links
 
SSV Jahn Regensburg profile on Weltfussball.de

 
Football clubs in Germany
Football clubs in Bavaria
Association football clubs established in 1907
Sport in Regensburg
Football in Upper Palatinate
1907 establishments in Germany
2. Bundesliga clubs
3. Liga clubs